The 2015–16 Charlotte 49ers men's basketball team represented the University of North Carolina at Charlotte during the 2015–16 NCAA Division I men's basketball season. The 49ers, led by first year head coach Mark Price, played their home games at the Dale F. Halton Arena and were members Conference USA. They finished the season 14–19, 9–9 in C-USA play to finish in seventh place. They defeated Rice in the second round of the C-USA tournament to advance to the quarterfinals where they lost to Middle Tennessee.

Previous season
The 49ers finished the 2014–15 season 14–18, 7–11 in C-USA play to finish in a tie for eleventh place. They lost in the first round of the C-USA tournament to Middle Tennessee.

Departures

Incoming transfers

Class of 2015 recruits

0

Roster

Schedule

|-
!colspan=12 style=| Exhibition

|-
!colspan=12 style=| Regular season

|-
!colspan=12 style=| Conference USA tournament

References

Charlotte
Charlotte 49ers men's basketball seasons
Charlotte 49ers men's basketball
Charlotte 49ers men's basketball